Abraham Middlesworth was a Michigan politician.

On November 8, 1854, Middlesworth was elected to the Michigan House of Representatives where he represented the Genesee County 2nd district from January 3, 1855 to December 31, 1856. Middlesworth resided in the city of Argentine, Michigan at the time of his election. During his single term in the legislature, he served on his chamber's Election Committee.

References

People from Genesee County, Michigan
Members of the Michigan House of Representatives
19th-century American politicians